Charles Thatcher may refer to:

 Charles M. Thatcher (1843–1900), American soldier in the American Civil War
 Charles Robert Thatcher (1830–1878), New Zealand singer, entertainer and songwriter